Ilex qianlingshanensis, commonly known in China as 黔灵山冬青 (Qianling Mountain holly) is a species of plant in the family Aquifoliaceae. It is endemic to China.

References

qianlingshanensis
Endemic flora of China
Endangered flora of Asia
Taxonomy articles created by Polbot